Soft matter or soft condensed matter is a subfield of condensed matter comprising a variety of physical systems that are deformed or structurally altered by thermal or mechanical stress of the magnitude of thermal fluctuations. These materials share an important common feature in that predominant physical behaviors occur at an energy scale comparable with room temperature thermal energy (of order of kT), and that entropy is considered the dominant factor. At these temperatures, quantum aspects are generally unimportant. Soft materials include liquids, colloids, polymers, foams, gels, granular materials, liquid crystals, flesh, and a number of biomaterials. Pierre-Gilles de Gennes, who has been called the "founding father of soft matter," received the Nobel Prize in Physics in 1991 for discovering that methods developed for studying order phenomena in simple systems can be generalized to the more complex cases found in soft matter, in particular, to the behaviors of liquid crystals and polymers.

History 
The current understanding of soft matter grew from the Albert Einstein's work on Brownian motion, understanding that a particle suspended in a fluid must have a similar thermal energy to the fluid itself (of order of kT). This work built on established research into systems that would now be considered colloids.

The crystalline optical properties of liquid crystals and their ability to flow were first described by Friedrich Reinitzer in 1888, and further characterized by Otto Lehmann in 1889. The experimental setup that Lehmann used to investigate the two melting points of cholesteryl benzoate are still used in the research of liquid crystals today.

In 1920, Hermann Staudinger, recipient of the 1953 Nobel Prize in Chemistry, was the first person to suggest that polymers are formed through covalent bonds that link smaller molecules together. The idea of a macromolecule was unheard of at the time, with the scientific consensus that the recorded high molecular weights of compounds like natural rubber were instead due to particle aggregation.

The use of hydrogel in the biomedical field was pioneered in 1960 by Drahoslav Lím and Otto Wichterle. Together, they postulated that the chemical stability, ease of deformation, and permeability of certain polymer networks in aqueous environments would have a significant impact on medicine, and were the inventors of the soft contact lens.

These seemingly separate fields were dramatically influenced and brought together by Pierre-Gilles de Gennes. de Gennes' work across different forms of soft matter were key in understanding its universality, where material properties are not based on the chemistry of the underlying structure, more so on the mesoscopic structures the underlying chemistry creates. de Gennes extended the understanding of phase changes in liquid crystals, introduced the idea of reptation regarding the relaxation of polymer systems, and successfully mapped polymer behavior to that of the Ising model.

Distinctive physics 

Interesting behaviors arise from soft matter in ways that cannot be predicted, or are difficult to predict, directly from its atomic or molecular constituents. Materials termed soft matter exhibit this property due to a shared propensity of these materials to self-organize into mesoscopic physical structures. The assembly of the mesoscale structures that form the macroscale material is governed by low energies, and these low energy associations allow for the thermal and mechanical deformation of the material. By way of contrast, in hard condensed matter physics it is often possible to predict the overall behavior of a material because the molecules are organized into a crystalline lattice with no changes in the pattern at any mesoscopic scale. Unlike hard materials, where only small distortions occur from thermal or mechanical agitation, soft matter can undergo local rearrangements of the microscopic building blocks.

A defining characteristic of soft matter is the mesoscopic scale of physical structures. The structures are much larger than the microscopic scale (the arrangement of atoms and molecules), and yet are much smaller than the macroscopic (overall) scale of the material.  The properties and interactions of these mesoscopic structures may determine the macroscopic behavior of the material. The large number of constituents forming these mesoscopic structures, and the large degrees of freedom this causes, results in a general disorder between the large-scale structures. This disorder leads to the loss of long-range order that is characteristic of hard matter. For example, the turbulent vortices that naturally occur within a flowing liquid are much smaller than the overall quantity of liquid and yet much larger than its individual molecules, and the emergence of these vortices control the overall flowing behavior of the material.  Also, the bubbles that compose a foam are mesoscopic because they individually consist of a vast number of molecules, and yet the foam itself consists of a great number of these bubbles, and the overall mechanical stiffness of the foam emerges from the combined interactions of the bubbles.

Typical bond energies in soft matter structures are of similar scale as thermal energies, therefore, the structures are constantly affected by thermal fluctuations and undergo Brownian motion. The ease of deformation and influence of low energy interactions regularly result in slow dynamics of the mesoscopic structures which allows some systems to remain out of equilibrium in metastable states. This characteristic can allow for recovery of initial state through an external stimuli and is often exploited in research.

Self-assembly is an inherent characteristic of soft matter systems. The characteristic complex behavior and hierarchical structures arise spontaneously as the system evolves towards equilibrium. Self-assembly can be classified as static, where the resulting structure is due to a free energy minimum, or dynamic, which occurs when the system is caught in a metastable state. Dynamic self-assembly can be utilized in the functional design of soft materials with these metastable states through kinetic trapping. 

Soft materials often exhibit both elasticity and viscous responses to external stimuli, such as shear induced flow or phase transitions, however, excessive external stimuli often result in nonlinear responses. Soft matter becomes highly deformed before crack propagation, which differs significantly from the general fracture mechanics formulation. Rheology, the study of deformation under stress, is often used to investigate the bulk properties of soft matter.

Classes of soft matter 

Soft matter consists of a diverse range of interrelated systems and can be broadly categorized into certain classes. These classes are by no means distinct, as often there are overlaps between two or more groups.

Polymers 

Polymers are large molecules composed of repeating subunits whose characteristics are governed by their environment and composition. Polymers encompass synthetic plastics, natural fibers and rubbers, and biological proteins. Polymer research finds applications in nanotechnology, and from materials science and drug delivery to protein crystallization.

Foams 

Foams consist of a liquid or solid through which a gas has been dispersed to form cavities.  This structure imparts a large surface-area-to-volume ratio on the system. Foams have found applications in insulation and textiles, and are undergoing active research in the biomedical field of drug delivery and tissue engineering.

Gels 

Gels consist of non-solvent-soluble 3D polymer scaffolds, which are covalently or physically cross-linked, that have a high-solvent content ratio. Research into functionalizing gels that are sensitive to mechanical and thermal stress, as well as solvent choice, have given rise to diverse structures with characteristics such as shape-memory, or the ability to bind guest molecules selectively and reversibly.

Colloids 

Colloids are non-soluble particles suspended in a medium, such as proteins in an aqueous solution. Research into colloids is primarily focused on understanding the organization of matter, with the large structures of colloids, relative to individual molecules, large enough that they can be readily observed.

Liquid Crystals 

Liquid crystals can consist of proteins, small molecules, or polymers, that can be manipulated to form cohesive order in a specific direction. They exhibit liquid like behavior in that they can flow, yet they can obtain close-to crystal alignment. One feature of liquid crystals is their ability to spontaneously break symmetry. Liquid crystals have found significant applications in optical devices such as liquid-crystal displays (LCD).

Biological Membranes 

Biological membranes consist of individual phospholipid molecules that have self-assembled into a bilayer structure due to non-covalent interactions. The localized, low energy associated with the forming of the membrane allow for the elastic deformation of the large-scale structure.

Experimental characterization 
Due to the importance of mesoscale structures in the overarching properties of soft matter, experimental work is primarily focused on the bulk properties of the materials. Rheology is often used to investigate the physical changes of the material under stress. Biological systems, such as protein crystallization, are often investigated through X-ray and neutron crystallography, while nuclear magnetic resonance spectroscopy can be used in understanding the average structure and lipid mobility of membranes.

Scattering 

Scattering techniques, such as wide-angle X-ray scattering, small-angle X-ray scattering, neutron scattering, and dynamic light scattering can also be used for materials when probing for the average properties of the constituents. These methods can determine particle-size distribution, shape, crystallinity and diffusion of the constituents in the system. There are limitations in the application of scattering techniques to some systems, as they can be more suited to isotropic and dilute samples.

Computational 

Computational methods are often employed to understand model soft matter systems, as they have the ability to strictly control the composition and environment of the structures being investigated, as well as span from microscopic to macroscopic length scales. Computational methods are limited, however, by their suitability to the system and must be regularly validated against experimental results to ensure accuracy. The use of informatics in the prediction of soft matter properties is also a growing field in computer science thanks to the large amount of data available for soft matter systems.

Microscopy 

Optical microscopy can be used in the study of colloidal systems, however, more advanced methods like transmission electron microscopy (TEM) and atomic force microscopy (AFM) are often used to characterize forms of soft matter due to their applicability to map systems at the nanoscale. These imagining techniques are not universally appropriate to all classes of soft matter and some systems may be more suited to one analysis over the other. For example, there are limited applications in imagining hydrogels with TEM due to the processes required for imaging, however, fluorescence microscopy can be readily applied. Liquid crystals are often probed using polarized light microscopy to determine the ordering of the material under various conditions, such as temperature or electric field.

Applications 
Soft materials are important in a wide range of technological applications, and each soft material can often be associated with multiple disciplines. Liquid crystals, for example, were originally discovered in the biological sciences when the botanist and chemist Friedrich Reinitzer was investigating cholesterols. Now, however, liquid crystals have also found applications as liquid-crystal displays, liquid crystal tunable filters, and liquid crystal thermometers. Active liquid crystals are another example of soft materials, where the constituent elements in liquid crystals can self propel. 

Polymers are ubiquitous with soft matter and have found diverse applications, from the natural rubber found in latex gloves to vulcanized rubber found in tires. Polymers encompass a large range of soft matter with applications in material science, an example of this is hydrogel. With the ability to undergo shear thinning, hydrogels are well suited for the development of 3D printing. Due to their stimuli responsive behavior, 3D printing of hydrogels have found applications in a diverse range of fields, such as soft robotics, tissue engineering, and flexible electronics. Polymers also encompass biological molecules such as proteins, where research insights from soft matter research have been applied to better understand topics like protein crystallization.

Foams can naturally occur, such as the head on a beer, or be created with purpose, like fire extinguishers. The range of physical properties available to foams have resulted in applications which can be based on their viscosity. With more rigid and self-supporting forms of foams being used as insulation or cushions, and foams that exhibit the ability to flow being used in the cosmetic industry as shampoos or makeup. Foams have also found biomedical applications in tissue engineering as scaffolds and biosensors.

Historically the problems considered in the early days of soft matter science were those pertaining to the biological sciences. As such, an important application of soft matter research is biophysics with a major goal of the discipline being the reduction of the field of cell biology to the concepts of soft matter physics. Applications of soft matter characteristics are used to understand biologically relevant topics such as membrane mobility, as well as the rheology of blood.

See also 

 Biological membranes 
 Biomaterials
 Colloids
 Complex fluids
 Foams
 Fracture of soft materials
 Gels 
 Granular materials
 Liquids
 Liquid crystals
 Microemulsions
 Polymers
 Protein dynamics
 Protein structure
 Surfactants
 Active matter
 Hard matter
 Roughness

References

I. Hamley, Introduction to Soft Matter  (2nd edition), J. Wiley, Chichester (2000).
R. A. L. Jones, Soft Condensed Matter, Oxford University Press, Oxford (2002).
T. A. Witten (with P. A. Pincus), Structured Fluids: Polymers, Colloids, Surfactants, Oxford (2004).
M. Kleman and O. D. Lavrentovich, Soft Matter Physics: An Introduction, Springer (2003).
M. Mitov, Sensitive Matter: Foams, Gels, Liquid Crystals and Other Miracles, Harvard University Press (2012).
J. N. Israelachvili, Intermolecular and Surface Forces, Academic Press (2010).
A. V. Zvelindovsky (editor), Nanostructured Soft Matter - Experiment, Theory, Simulation and Perspectives, Springer/Dordrecht (2007), .
M. Daoud, C.E. Williams (editors), Soft Matter Physics, Springer Verlag, Berlin (1999).
Gerald H. Ristow, Pattern Formation in Granular Materials, Springer Tracts in Modern Physics, v. 161. Springer, Berlin (2000). .
de Gennes, Pierre-Gilles, Soft Matter, Nobel Lecture, December 9, 1991
S. A. Safran,Statistical thermodynamics of surfaces, interfaces and membranes, Westview Press (2003)
R.G. Larson, "The Structure and Rheology of Complex Fluids," Oxford University Press (1999)
Gang, Oleg, "Soft Matter and Biomaterials on the Nanoscale: The WSPC Reference on Functional Nanomaterials — Part I (In 4 Volumes)", World Scientific Publisher (2020)

External links

Pierre-Gilles de Gennes' Nobel Lecture
American Physical Society Topical Group on Soft Matter (GSOFT)
Softbites - a blog run by graduate students and postdocs that makes soft matter more accessible through bite-sized posts that summarize current and classic soft matter research
Softmatterworld.org
Softmatterresources.com
SklogWiki - a wiki dedicated to simple liquids, complex fluids, and soft condensed matter.
Harvard School of Engineering and Applied Sciences Soft Matter Wiki - organizes, reviews, and summarizes academic papers on soft matter.
Soft Matter Engineering - A group dedicated to Soft Matter Engineering at the University of Florida
Google Scholar page on soft matter

 
Condensed matter physics